The Swiss Literary Archives (SLA - Schweizerische Literaturarchiv) in Bern collects literary estates in all four national languages of Switzerland (German, French, Italian and Romansh language). It is part of the Swiss National Library operated by the Federal Office of Culture within the Federal Department of Home Affairs.

The archives were founded in 1991 and are located in the building of the Swiss National Library. The foundation can be tracked back to the last will of the writer Friedrich Dürrenmatt, who died in 1989. Dürrenmatt gave his literary remains to the state, but under the condition that the state establishes a national archive for literature.

The Swiss Literary Archives today contain around 100 important literary estates and premortal-estates and about 120 partial estates and collections, including material from:

See also
 Swiss literature

Notes and references

External links 
 Official website
 Swiss Literary Archives in the archive database HelveticArchives of the Swiss National Library
 Swiss Literary Archives in the Swiss National Sound Archives

History of literature
Archives in Switzerland
Switzerland
Swiss Literary Archives
Swiss Literary Archives
Literary Archives
Culture in Bern
Literary archives
1991 establishments in Switzerland